The German Women's Basketball Cup (German: Deutscher Pokalsieger) is an annual basketball competition between clubs in Germany. It is Germany's first-tier cup competition and TSV 1880 Wasserburg is its current champion.

Title holders 

 1972–73 SC Göttingen 05
 1973–74 TV Grafenberg
 1974–75 USC München
 1975–76 Tus 04 Leverkusen
 1976–77 Tus 04 Leverkusen
 1977–78 Düsseldorfer BG
 1978–79 Tus 04 Leverkusen
 1979–80 DJK Agon 08 Düsseldorf
 1980–81 DJK Agon 08 Düsseldorf 
 1981–82 SG BC USC München    
 1982–83 DJK Agon 08 Düsseldorf  
 1983–84 DJK Agon 08 Düsseldorf  
 1984–85 DJK Agon 08 Düsseldorf  
 1985–86 DJK Agon 08 Düsseldorf  
 1986–87 SG BC USC München
 1987–88 DJK Agon 08 Düsseldorf
 1988–89 Barmer TV 1846 Wuppertal 
 1989–90 SG BC USC München 
 1990–91 SG BC USC München 
 1991–92 Barmer TV 1846 Wuppertal 
 1992–93 Barmer TV 1846 Wuppertal 
 1993–94 BTV Wuppertal 1846
 1994–95 BTV Wuppertal 1846 
 1995–96 BTV Wuppertal 1846
 1996–97 BTV Wuppertal 1846 
 1997–98 BTV Wuppertal 1846 
 1998–99 BTV Wuppertal 1846 
 1999–00 BTV Wuppertal 1846
 2000–01 BTV Gold-Zack Wuppertal
 2001–02 BTV Gold-Zack Wuppertal 
 2002–03 BC uniVersa Marburg 
 2003–04 BG Dorsten 
 2004–05 TSV 1880 Wasserburg 
 2005–06 TSV 1880 Wasserburg 
 2006–07 TSV 1880 Wasserburg
 2007–08 TV Saarlouis Royals 
 2008–09 TV Saarlouis Royals 
 2009–10 TV Saarlouis Royals
 2010–11 TSV 1880 Wasserburg 
 2011–12 evo New Baskets Oberhausen 
 2012–13 Eisvögel USC Freiburg
 2013–14 TSV 1880 Wasserburg
 2014–15 TSV 1880 Wasserburg 
 2015–16 TSV 1880 Wasserburg 
 2016–17 TSV 1880 Wasserburg 
 2017–18 TSV 1880 Wasserburg 

Source

See also
German Basketball Federation
Damen-Basketball-Bundesliga

References

External links
 Icelandic Basketball Federation 

1975 establishments in Iceland
Women's basketball cup competitions in Europe
Women's basketball competitions in Germany
Women
Recurring sporting events established in 1975